Dubai Abulhoul (Arabic : دبي بالهول) is an Emirati author and columnist who was born on 1996. She is known to be the first Emirati ever to write fantasy novel in English "Galagolia: The Hidden Divination" and the youngest author to participate in the Emirates Airline Festival of Literature. She has five published books. In 2008, she was given a special recognition award for her debut animal film Galagolia at the Gulf Film Festival.

Education and career 
Dubai Abulhoul is an Emirati author and columnist who was born in the United Arab Emirates on 1996. She graduated from the New York University Abu Dhabi with a bachelor's degree in Political Science in 2017. A year later, she earned her master's degree in Global Governance and Diplomacy from the University of Oxford. Abulhoul is also a columnist for "Al Bayan" and "Gulf Today" newspapers. Abulhoul is known to be the first Emirati author to participate at the Emirates Airline Festival of Literature in 2012, the First Emirati novelist to write a fantasy novel in English, and the youngest speaker at the TEDx-Dubai in 2009 since she was 13 years old. Abulhoul published her first fantasy novel "Galagolia: The Hidden Divination" when she was at the age of 13. In 2008, she was named as the Youngest Director of the Middle East at the age of 11. For her work in literature, youth advocacy, and journalism, Abulhoul was named the Young Arab of the Year at the first Young Arab Awards of ITP Media Group in 2016. In the same year, the UAE government appointed Dubai Abulhoul as a member of Emirates Youth Council.

Works

Novels 

 Galagolia: The Hidden Divination, 2012

Short-story collections 

 "Al Dasis People" (original title: Qaoum al-Dasis), 2019
 "Rafai Speech" (original title: Khetab Rafai), 2018
 "The Boys’ Mum" (original title: Um al-Sibian), 2018
 “Bu al-Slasil”, 2019

Awards 
 2008: She was given a special recognition award for her animation film "Galagolia" at the Gulf Film festival.
 2016: She was named the Young Arab of the Year at the first Young Arab Awards of ITP Media Group for her work in literature, journalism, and youth advocacy.

See also 
 Afra Atiq
 Eman Al Yousuf 
 Nadia Al Najjar

References 

Emirati writers
Emirati women writers
21st-century Emirati women writers
21st-century Emirati writers
1996 births
Living people